This page is a list of the lords of Chalon-Arlay (in the county of Burgundy) and the principality of Orange.
The lords of Chalons and Arlay were a cadet branch of the ruling house of the county of Burgundy, the Anscarids or House of Ivrea.
 
For more details, and a family tree, see below.

Lord of Chalon-Arlay
 John, Count of Chalon, founder of the seigneurie of Chalon-Arlay
 John I of Chalon-Arlay (1258-1315), seigneur of Arlay (1266-1315) and vicomte of Besançon (son of the above).
 Hugh I of Chalon-Arlay (1288-1322), seigneur of Arlay and of Vitteaux (son of the above).
 John II of Chalon-Arlay (1312-), seigneur of Arlay (son of the above).
 Hugh II of Chalon-Arlay (1334-1388) seigneur of Arlay (son of the above).

Lord of Chalon-Arlay and Prince of Orange
 John III of Chalon-Arlay (?-1418) seigneur d'Arlay and prince of Orange (nephew of the former).
 Louis II of Chalon-Arlay (1390-1463), seigneur of Arlay and Arguel and prince of Orange (son of the former).
 William VII of Chalon-Arlay (?-1475), prince of Orange (son of the former).
 John IV of Chalon-Arlay (1443-1502), prince of Orange, seigneur of Arlay, of Nozeroy and of Montfort (son of the former)
 Philibert of Chalon (1502-1530), prince of Orange, seigneur of Arlay and seigneur of Nozeroy (son of the former, died childless)
 René of Chalon (1519-1544) prince of Orange, stadtholder of Holland, Zeeland, of the Diocese of Utrecht and of Guelders (nephew of the former, died childless, succeeded as prince of Orange by William the Silent).

Arms

See also
House of Chalon

References

Further reading
Tourney, Elinor. The Rise of Chalon-Arlay: The Reactions of a Great French Dynasty to the Economic and Political Trends of the High Middle Ages, 1230–1320. PhD thesis. Wellesley College, 1963.

External links
Family Tree of the Counts of Burgundy, The Free County,Franche Comté,(capital Besançon) 914-1678 AD by Kelley Ross with documentation citation
family tree of Chalons-Arlay: Les Sires de Chalon Arlay et Princes d'Orange de 1259 et 1544